Two Under the Stars (German: Zwei unterm Himmelszelt) is a 1927 German silent film directed by Johannes Guter and Ernst Wolff and starring Margarete Schlegel, Ernst Deutsch and Jean Angelo.

Cast

References

Bibliography
 Bock, Hans-Michael & Bergfelder, Tim. The Concise CineGraph. Encyclopedia of German Cinema. Berghahn Books, 2009.

External links

1927 films
Films of the Weimar Republic
Films directed by Johannes Guter
German silent feature films
German black-and-white films